Ramjerd-e Do Rural District is a rural district (dehestan) in Dorudzan District, Marvdasht County, Fars Province, Iran. At the 2006 census, its population (including Ramjerd, which was subsequently detached from the rural district and promoted to city status) was 15,427, in 3,610 families; excluding Ramjerd, the population in 2006 was 13,394, in 3,164 families.  The rural district has 31 villages.

References 

Rural Districts of Fars Province
Marvdasht County